This Is Football 2005, known as World Tour Soccer 2006 in North America, is a sports video game developed by London Studio and published by Sony Computer Entertainment exclusively for PlayStation 2.

Reception

This is Football 2005 received "mixed or average" reviews, according to review aggregator Metacritic.

References

External links

2004 video games
Association football video games
Multiplayer and single-player video games
PlayStation 2 games
PlayStation 2-only games
Sony Interactive Entertainment games
This Is Football
Video games developed in the United Kingdom
London Studio games